Vincent Michael Woodman (6 August 1937—2 June 2021) was a British racing driver. He started racing in 1965 and competed mainly in touring cars, mostly with cars from the Ford marque. In 1973 he finished third overall in the British Saloon Car Championship, driving a 1300cc Ford Escort. He finished fifth in the BSCC in 1982, winning four races outright, the last wins for a Ford Capri.

Racing record

Complete British Saloon / Touring Car Championship results
(key) (Races in bold indicate pole position; races in italics indicate fastest lap.)

† Events with 2 races staged for the different classes.

‡ Endurance driver.

^ Race with 2 heats - Aggregate result.

References

External links
 

1938 births
Living people
English racing drivers
British Touring Car Championship drivers